Signepupina is a genus of land snails with an operculum, terrestrial gastropod mollusks in the subfamily Pupillinae of the family Pupinidae.

Species
 Signepupina attenuata Stanisic, 2010
 Signepupina babinda Stanisic, 2010
 Signepupina bilinguis (L. Pfeiffer, 1851)
 Signepupina coxeni (Brazier, 1875)
 Signepupina crossei (Brazier, 1876)
 Signepupina davidsoni Stanisic, 2010
 Signepupina dunkensis Stanisic, 2010
 Signepupina glenugie Stanisic, 2010
 Signepupina masoni Stanisic, 2010
 Signepupina meridionalis (L. Pfeiffer, 1864)
 Signepupina pfeifferi (Dohrn, 1862)
 Signepupina pineticola (Cox, 1866)
 Signepupina robusta (Cox, 1868)
 Signepupina rubiflava Stanisic, 2010
 Signepupina strangei (L. Pfeiffer, 1854)
 Signepupina tenuis (Hedley, 1912)
 Signepupina thomsoni (Forbes, 1852)
 Signepupina ventrosa (Dohrn, 1862)
 Signepupina wilcoxi (Cox, 1864)
 Signepupina worsfoldi Stanisic, 2010
 Signepupina yaamba Stanisic, 2010

References

 Bank, R. A. (2017). Classification of the Recent terrestrial Gastropoda of the World. Last update: July 16th, 2017

External links
 Iredale, T. (1937). A basic list of the land Mollusca of Australia. The Australian Zoologist. 8(4): 287-333